Vilches may refer to:

Vilches, Spain, municipality in Jaén, Spain

People
Christian Vilches (born 1983), Chilean footballer
Eduardo Vilches (born 1963), Chilean footballer
Héctor Vilches (born 1926), Uruguayan footballer
Nimfa C. Vilches (1956–2011), Filipino lawyer and judge
Raúl Vilches (1954–2022), Cuban volleyball player